The 35th Venice Biennale, held in 1970, was an exhibition of international contemporary art, with 28 participating nations. The Venice Biennale takes place biennially in Venice, Italy. No prizes were awarded this year or in any Biennale between 1968 and 1986.

References

Bibliography

Further reading 

 
 
 
 
 
 
 
 
 
 
 
 
 
 
 
 
 
 
 
 
 
 
 
 
 
 
 

1970 in art
1970 in Italy
Venice Biennale exhibitions